Tim is a name, originally a short form of Timothy. It is a version of the Greek name  (Timόtheos) meaning "one who honours God", from τιμή "honour" and θεός "god". Tim (and its variations) is a common name in several countries.

In Glasgow, Scotland Tim is a slang term for a Catholic.

In academia
Tim Berners-Lee, English founder of the World-Wide Web
Tim Harford, English economist author and popularizer of economics
Tim de Zeeuw (born 1956), Dutch astronomer

In arts and entertainment
Tim Armstrong (born 1965), punk rock musician
Tim Bergling (Avicii) Swedish DJ
Tim Allen, American actor
Tim Armstrong, American musician
Tim Braun, percussionist for American red dirt metal ensemble Texas Hippie Coalition
Tim Brooke-Taylor, English actor
Tim Buckley, American singer and musician
Tim Burton, American director
Tim Christensen, Danish musician
Tim Conway, American actor
Tim Dever, American actor
Tim Daly, American actor
Tim Curry, English actor
Tim Commerford, bassist for Rage Against The Machine and Audioslave
Tim Hardin, an American folk and blues musician and composer. 
Tim Harding (musician), original member of Australian children's musical group Hi-5
Tim Heidecker, American actor
Tim Hildebrandt, American illustrator
Tim Holt, American actor
Tim Kash, British television presenter
Tim Key, English actor, writer and performance poet
Tim Lagasse, American muppeteer
Tim Maddren, Australian television personality and modern member of Hi-5
Tim Maia, stage name of Sebastião Rodrigues Maia, Brazilian singer-songwriter and businessman
Tim Mälzer, German television chef 
Tim McGraw, American country singer
Tim McIlrath, Lead singer and rhythm guitarist for the American punk rock band Rise Against
Tim Meadows, American actor and comedian
Tim Minchin, Australian comedian–musician
Tim Moore, American actor and comedian
Tim Reuten, Dutch Deejay
Tim Rice, British lyricist
Tim Robbins, American actor
Tim Roth, English actor
Tim Russ, American actor
Tim Thomerson, American actor
Tim Urban, American musician
Tim Van Patten (born 1959), American director, actor, screenwriter, and producer
Tim Vine, British comedian
Tim Westwood, British DJ and broadcaster
Tiny Tim (musician) (Herbert Buckingham Khaury), American singer, ukulele player, and musical archivist
Tim (singer), popular K-pop solo singer

In politics
 Tim Farron, British politician
 Tim Hutchinson, former United States Senator from Arkansas
 Tim Johnson, former United States Senator from South Dakota
 Tim Kaine, United States Senator from Virginia
 Tim Orbos, Filipino businessman, government administrator, and politician
 Tim Pawlenty, former Minnesota governor
 Tim Ryan, Democratic Congressperson from Ohio
 Tim Scott, United States Senator from South Carolina
 Tim Smith, member of the Victorian Legislative Assembly
 Tim Wilson, Australian federal politician

In sports

In American football
Tim Biakabutuka, NFL player
Tim Bowens, NFL player
Tim Boyle, American football player
Tim Couch, NFL player
Tim Cowan, American football player
Tim Daniel, American football player
Tim Gilligan, American football player
Tim Gray, NFL player
Tim Grunhard, NFL player
Tim Hasselbeck, NFL player
Tim Hightower, NFL player
Tim Jennings, NFL player
Tim Krumrie, NFL player
Tim Levcik, American football player
Tim Riordan, American football player
Tim Settle, American football player
Tim Simpson, American football player
Tim Tebow, American football player
Tim Williams, American football player

In baseball
Tim Atherton, Australian baseball player
Tim Belcher, MLB player
Tim Foli, MLB player
Tim Hudson, American baseball player
Tim Kennelly, Australian professional baseball player
Tim Lincecum, American baseball player
Tim McCarver, MLB player & broadcaster
Tim Murnane, MLB player & sportswriter
Tim Raines, MLB player
Tim Salmon, MLB player
Tim Wakefield, American baseball player
Tim Wallach, MLB player

In basketball
Tim Cone, American basketball coach for the Philippine Basketball Association
Tim Duncan, American basketball coach and player
Tim Floyd, American basketball coach
Tim Frick, Canadian wheelchair basketball coach
Tim Hardaway, American basketball player
Tim Hardaway Jr., American basketball player
Tim Legler, American basketball player and commentator
Tim Soares (born 1997), American-Brazilian basketball player for Ironi Ness Ziona of the Israeli Basketball Premier League
Tim Thomas, American basketball player

In football (soccer)
Tim Borowski, German footballer
Tim Cahill, Australian footballer
Tim de Cler (born 1978), Dutch footballer
Tim DiBisceglie, American footballer
Tim Hoogland, German footballer
Tim Howard, American footballer
Tim Krul (born 1988), Dutch footballer
Tim Matavž (born 1989), Slovenian footballer
Tim Ream, American footballer
Tim Wiese, German footballer
Tim, Brazilian footballer and manager

In rugby
Tim Browne, Australian Rugby League player
Tim Grant (rugby league), Australian Rugby League player
Tim Lafai, Samoan Rugby League player
Tim Mannah, Australian Rugby League player
Tim Moltzen, Australian Rugby League player
Tim Simona, New Zealand Rugby League player
Tim Visser (born 1987), Dutch rugby union player

In hockey
 Tim Brent, NHL player
 Tim Conboy, NHL player
 Tim Connolly, NHL player
 Tim Ecclestone, NHL player
 Tim Gleason, NHL player
 Tim Horton, NHL player
 Tim Jackman, NHL player
 Tim Kennedy (ice hockey), NHL player
 Tim Kerr, NHL player
 Tim Sestito, NHL player
 Tim Stützle, NHL player
 Tim Thomas (ice hockey, born 1974), NHL player
 Tim Wallace, NHL player
 Tim Young (ice hockey), NHL player

In cricket
Tim Bresnan, English cricketer
Tim May, Australian cricketer
Tim Munton, English cricketer
Tim Paine, Australian cricketer
Tim Ravenscroft, Guernsey cricketer
Tim Robinson, English cricketer
Tim Southee, New Zealand cricketer
Tim Zoehrer, Australian cricketer

In other sports
Tim DeBoom, Ironman triathlete
Tim Don, Triathlete
Timo Glock, German motor racing driver
Tim Gould, Mountain Bike racer
Tim Henman, English tennis player
Tim Mayotte, American tennis player 
Tim Janus, American competitive eater
Tim Silvia, Mixed Martial Arts fighter
Tim Veldt (born 1984), Dutch track cyclist
Tim Wellens (born 1991), Belgian racing cyclist
Tim White (wrestling), wrestling referee
Tim Wood, American figure skater

In other fields
Tim Berners-Lee, inventor of the World Wide Web
Tim Cook, CEO of Apple Inc
Tim Foecke, metallurgist
Tim Gunn, television personality
Tim Krabbé (born 1943), Dutch journalist, novelist and chess writer
Tim Kretschmer, German mass murderer
Tim Kurkjian, Baseball writer and analyst
Tim LaHaye, American author and evangelical minister
Tim Mudde, Dutch rightist
Tim Russert, American news anchor
Tim Ryan (sportscaster), American sportscaster
Tim Steiner (businessman) (born 1969), British businessman, CEO of Ocado

Fictional characters
Tim, a character from the film Robots
TIM, a computer from The Tomorrow People
Tim the Bear, a character from The Cleveland Show
Tim the Beaver, the mascot of the Massachusetts Institute of Technology
Tim Bisley, a character in the television series Spaced
Tim Canterbury, a character from The Office
Tim Carpenter, a character in Final Destination 2
Tim Delaney, a character in the Netflix series Grand Army
Tim Drake, the third character to go by the name of "Robin" in DC Comics
Tim Flaherty, a character from Ghost Whisperer
Tim Okazaki, a character in Angry Boys
Tim Riggins, a fictional character from Friday Night Lights
Tim Rimmer, a character in the Pixar film Cars
Tim Speedle, a character in CSI: Miami
Tim Taylor, a character in Home Improvement
Tim the Enchanter, a character from the film Monty Python and the Holy Grail
"Tiny" Tim Cratchit, a fictional character from Charles Dickens' A Christmas Carol
Tinny Tim, a character in Futurama

Disambiguations
Tim Harris (disambiguation), multiple people
Tim Hunter (disambiguation), multiple people
Tim Ryan (disambiguation), multiple people
Tim Ward (disambiguation), multiple people

See also
 Timothy
 Timmy
 Timo
 Timotheus
 Timothée

References

Given names of Greek language origin
Masculine given names
English given names
English masculine given names
Hypocorisms